The Fact Music Awards (abbreviated as TMA) is an awards ceremony hosted by The Fact and organized by Fan N Star that recognizes major contributors to the Hallyu wave. Established in 2019, The Fact Music Awards determines its winners through objective data from Gaon, a panel of judges, and the support and participation scores of fans at home and abroad.

The awards ceremony broadcasts across Asia through multiple channels including both V Live and ABS-CBN.

The December 2020 ceremony was replaced by an online ceremony for awards in all categories in the aftermath of the COVID-19 pandemic to prevent further spread of the virus and to ensure the safety of both fans and artists.

Ceremonies

Grand Prize (Daesang)

Artist of the Year (Bonsang)

Best Performer Award

Next Leader Award

Worldwide Icon Award

Popularity Award

Listener's Choice Award

Global Hottest Award

Other Awards

Fan N Star Awards
(Determined through fan votes)

Fan N Star Angel N Star Award

Fan N Star Choice Award

Fan N Star Four N Star Award

Fan N Star Global Award

Fan N Star Most Votes Award

Fan N Star Trot Popularity Award

Fan N Star Best Ads. Award

Fan N Star Hall of Fame Award

Fan N Star Special Award

Most Wins

General references
 April 24, 2019 Winners:
 March 16, 2020 Winners:
 December 12, 2020 Winners:
 October 2, 2021 Winners:
 October 8, 2022 Winners:

References

Annual events in South Korea
South Korean music awards
Awards established in 2019
October 2022 events in South Korea